Lardal is a former municipality in Vestfold county, Norway.  The administrative centre of the municipality was the village of Svarstad.  The parish of Laurdal was established as a municipality on 1 January 1838 (see formannskapsdistrikt).  The municipality was divided into the parishes of Svarstad, Styrvoll, and Hem.

As a part of Norway's nationwide municipal reform, Lardal was merged into Larvik on 1 January 2018.

Pikstein, the highest point in Lardal, is located in westernmost Lardal at the border to Buskerud County.

General information

Name
The Old Norse form of the name was Lagardalr. The first element is the genitive case of lǫgr meaning "water" or "river" (here the Numedalslågen river). The last element is dalr which means "valley" or "dale". Prior to 1889, the name was spelled "Laurdal".

Coat-of-arms
The coat-of-arms is from modern times.  They were granted on 17 July 1992.  It was designed by Arvid Steen.  The arms show a golden hulder on a red background.  The hulder is a part of old Scandinavian folklore.  This was chosen to represent the large forested areas in Lardal that were said to be inhabited by hulder.

Churches

References

External links

Municipal fact sheet from Statistics Norway

 
Larvik
Populated places on the Numedalslågen